Moyen-Mono is a prefecture located in the Plateaux Region of Togo. The prefecture seat is located in Tohoun.

Canton (administrative divisions) of Moyen-Mono include Tohoun, Kpékplémé, Tado, Saligbè, Ahassomé, and Katomé.

References 

Prefectures of Togo
Plateaux Region, Togo